1153 Wallenbergia, provisional designation , is a stony Florian asteroid from the inner regions of the asteroid belt, approximately 8 kilometers in diameter. It was discovered on 5 September 1924, by Soviet astronomer Sergey Belyavsky at the Simeiz Observatory on the Crimean peninsula. The asteroid was named after German mathematician Georg Wallenberg.

Orbit and classification 

Wallenbergia is a member of the Flora family, a giant asteroid family and the largest family of stony asteroids in the main-belt. It orbits the Sun in the inner main-belt at a distance of 1.8–2.5 AU once every 3 years and 3 months (1,189 days). Its orbit has an eccentricity of 0.16 and an inclination of 3° with respect to the ecliptic.

Physical characteristics 

Wallenbergia has been characterized as a stony S-type asteroid by PanSTARRS photometric survey.

Rotation period 

In September 1989, the first rotational lightcurve of Wallenbergia was obtained from photometric observations by Polish astronomer Wiesław Z. Wiśniewski at University of Arizona. Lightcurve analysis gave a well-defined rotation period of 4.096 hours with a brightness amplitude of 0.33 magnitude. Observations in the R-band at the Palomar Transient Factory in 2014, gave a period of 4.116 and 4.12 hours with an amplitude of 0.25 and 0.23 magnitude, respectively.

Diameter and albedo 

According to the survey carried out by the NEOWISE mission of NASA's Wide-field Infrared Survey Explorer, Wallenbergia measures 8.02 and 8.037 kilometers in diameter and its surface has an albedo of 0.37 and 0.433, respectively.

The Collaborative Asteroid Lightcurve Link assumes an albedo of 0.24 – taken from 8 Flora, the parent body of the Flora family – and derives a diameter of 9.36 kilometers based on an absolute magnitude of 12.31.

Naming 

This minor planet was named after German mathematician Georg Wallenberg (1864–1924). The official naming citation was mentioned in The Names of the Minor Planets by Paul Herget in 1955.

Notes

References

External links 
 Theorie der linearen Differenzengleichungen, by Georg Wallenberg, Alf Guldberg
 Asteroid Lightcurve Database (LCDB), query form (info )
 Dictionary of Minor Planet Names, Google books
 Asteroids and comets rotation curves, CdR – Observatoire de Genève, Raoul Behrend
 Discovery Circumstances: Numbered Minor Planets (1)-(5000) – Minor Planet Center
 
 

001153
Discoveries by Sergei Belyavsky
Named minor planets
19240905